South West Essex and Settlement Reform Synagogue (SWESRS), on Oaks Lane, Newbury Park in Ilford, is a synagogue in the London Borough of Redbridge, England.

History

The community was founded in 1956. It is a member of the Movement for Reform Judaism and its immediate past Rabbi was Lisa Barrett who vacated the position in May 2021. Prior to Rabbi Lisa Barrett South West Essex and Settlement Reform Synagogue employed eminent Rabbi, Nancy Morris.

A new Rabbi, Jordan Helfman formerly of Holy Blossom Temple has been appointed and took up the post on 1 January 2022 supported by Student Rabbi Lev Taylor who will be undertaking a full student placement.  

It was known as South West Essex Reform Synagogue (SWERS) until 1998, when it merged with the St George's Settlement Synagogue in Stepney.

See also
 List of Jewish communities in the United Kingdom
 List of former synagogues in the United Kingdom
 Movement for Reform Judaism

References

External links
 Official website
 South West Essex and Settlement Reform Synagogue on Jewish Communities and Records – UK (hosted by JewishGen)
Settlement Synagogue on Jewish Communities and Records – UK (hosted by JewishGen)

1956 establishments in England
20th-century synagogues
Ilford
Reform synagogues in the United Kingdom
Religion in the London Borough of Redbridge
Jewish organizations established in 1956
Stepney
Synagogues in London